Corinne Bourquin (also known as Corinne Giger-Bourquin) is a Swiss curler and curling coach.

At the national level, she is a two-time Swiss women's champion curler (2010, 2014).

Teams

Record as a coach of national teams

References

External links

Living people

Swiss female curlers
Swiss curling champions
Swiss curling coaches
Date of birth missing (living people)
Place of birth missing (living people)
Year of birth missing (living people)
21st-century Swiss women